Que la barque se brise, que la jonque s'entrouvre (Literally, "Let the boat break its back, let the junk break open") is a 2001 French-Cambodian made-for-television romantic-drama film directed by Rithy Panh.

Synopsis
This telefilm describes the meeting between Cambodian restaurateur Bopha ("flower"), a survivor of the genocide of the Khmer Rouge, and a Vietnamese man named Mihn, a "boat people" refugee who drives a taxi at night and works as a deliveryman during the day for his uncle's grocery store.

Cast
 Vantha Talisman as Bopha
 Éric Nguyen as Mihn
 Molica Kheng as Lacksmey
 Chamroeun Na as Yeay Mean
 Amara Tan as Naline

External links

2001 films
2001 romantic drama films
French multilingual films
Cambodian multilingual films
2001 multilingual films
Films directed by Rithy Panh
2000s French films